Bridouxia is a genus of small tropical freshwater snails with an operculum, aquatic gastropod mollusks in the family Paludomidae.

Species of this genus are endemic to the Lake Tanganyika.

Species
Species within the genus Bridouxia include:
 Bridouxia giraudi Bourguignat, 1885 - type species
 Bridouxia leucoraphe (Ancey, 1890)
 Bridouxia ponsonbyi (Smith, 1889)
 Bridouxia praeclara (Bourguignat, 1885)
 Bridouxia rotundata (Smith, 1904)
 Bridouxia smithiana (Bourguignat, 1885)
Species brought into synonymy
 Bridouxia costata Bourguignat, 1885: synonym of Bridouxia giraudi Bourguignat, 1885 
 Bridouxia reymondi Bourguignat, 1885: synonym of Bridouxia giraudi Bourguignat, 1885 
 Bridouxia villeserriana Bourguignat, 1885: synonym of Bridouxia giraudi Bourguignat, 1885

Ecology
They live on hard substrata in shallow water on shores of Lake Tanganyika.

References

Paludomidae
Gastropod genera
Taxonomy articles created by Polbot
Taxa named by Jules René Bourguignat